Eugène N'Jo Léa (15 July 1931 – 23 October 2006) was a Cameroonian professional footballer who played in France with Saint-Étienne, Lyon and Racing Paris.

Personal life
His son is fellow player William N'Jo Léa.

With Just Fontaine he founded the National Union of Professional Football Players in 1961.

References

1931 births
2006 deaths
Cameroonian footballers
Association football forwards
Ligue 1 players
AS Saint-Étienne players
Olympique Lyonnais players
Racing Club de France Football players
Cameroonian expatriate footballers
Cameroonian expatriate sportspeople in France
Expatriate footballers in France